Vaughtia fenestrata is a species of sea snail, a marine gastropod mollusk in the family Muricidae, the murex snails or rock snails.

Description
The length of the shell attains 17 mm.

(Described as Cominella puncturata)  The shell is elongated, rather thin, pale yellow, sometimes brown, with a pale band. The spire is elevated and acute. The six whorls are sloping above, then bi-angulated and spirally ribbed throughout. The ribs are numerous, but very slightly raised. The interstices are punctured. The body whorl is convex, scarcely angulated and attenuated below. The aperture is ovate and moderately wide. The siphonal canal is short and slightly recurved.

Distribution
This marine species occurs off Jeffreys Bay, South Africa.

References

 Turton, W. H. (1932). Marine Shells of Port Alfred, South Africa. Humphrey Milford, London, xvi + 331 pp., 70 pls.
 Steyn, D.G. & Lussi, M. (1998) Marine Shells of South Africa. An Illustrated Collector's Guide to Beached Shells. Ekogilde Publishers, Hartebeespoort, South Africa, ii + 264 pp.
 Lussi M. (2012) Description of three new species of Vaughtia from off the Eastern Cape, South Africa with a revision of the genus (Gastropoda: Prosobranchia: Muricidae) from Southern Madagascar. Malacologia Mostra Mondiale 76: 5-13.
 Houart, R.; Kilburn, R. N. & Marais, A. P. (2010). Muricidae. pp. 176-270, in: Marais A.P. & Seccombe A.D. (eds), Identification guide to the seashells of South Africa. Volume 1. Groenkloof: Centre for Molluscan Studies. 376 pp.

External links
 Gould, A. A. (1860). Descriptions of new shells collected by the United States North Pacific Exploring Expedition. Proceedings of the Boston Society of Natural History. 7: 323-336
 Philippi, R. A. (1845-1847). Abbildungen und Beschreibungen neuer oder wenig gekannter Conchylien. Zweiter Band. 2. Cassel: Fischer. 1-231, pls. 1-48.
 Houart, R. (1995). Pterymarchia n. gen. and Vaughtia n. gen., two new muricid genera (Gastropoda: Muricidae: Muricinae and Ocenebrinae). Apex. 10 (4): 127-136

fenestrata
Gastropods described in 1860